Chezzetcook may refer to the following places:
East Chezzetcook, Nova Scotia
Head of Chezzetcook, Nova Scotia
Lower East Chezzetcook, Nova Scotia
West Chezzetcook, Nova Scotia